St. Gregor is a village in the Canadian province of Saskatchewan within the Rural Municipality of St. Peter No. 369 and Census Division No. 15. It is approximately 20 km west of the Town of Watson on Highway 5.

History 
St. Gregor incorporated as a village on March 26, 1920.

Demographics 

See also 
 List of communities in Saskatchewan
 Villages of Saskatchewan

References

External links
Municipal Directory Saskatchewan - Village of St. Gregor
Saskatchewan City & Town Maps
Saskatchewan Gen Web - One Room School Project 
Post Offices and Postmasters - ArchiviaNet - Library and Archives Canada
Saskatchewan Gen Web Region
Online Historical Map Digitization Project
GeoNames Query 
2001 Community Profiles

Villages in Saskatchewan
St. Peter No. 369, Saskatchewan
Division No. 15, Saskatchewan